Eugène Louis Constant (8 January 1901 – 22 October 1970) was a French rower who competed in the 1924 Summer Olympics.

In 1924 he won the silver medal as member of the French boat in the coxed four event. He also finished fourth as part of the French boat in the coxed pair competition.

References

External links
Eugène Constant's profile at databaseOlympics

1901 births
1970 deaths
French male rowers
Olympic rowers of France
Rowers at the 1924 Summer Olympics
Olympic silver medalists for France
Olympic medalists in rowing
Medalists at the 1924 Summer Olympics
European Rowing Championships medalists
20th-century French people